Bossembélé Airport  was an airstrip located within Bossembélé, a town in the Ombella-M'Poko prefecture of the Central African Republic. Mature trees now overhang the former runway.

See also

Transport in the Central African Republic
List of airports in the Central African Republic

References

External links 
OpenStreetMap - Bossembélé

Defunct airports
Airports in the Central African Republic
Buildings and structures in Ombella-M'Poko